This is a list of roads designated A12.  Entries are sorted in alphabetical order by country.

 A012 road (Argentina), a road around the city of Rosario 
 A12 motorway (Austria), a road connecting Kufstein and the German Autobahn A 93 to Landeck
 A12 road (Belgium), a road from the border with the Netherlands near Zandvliet to Brussels via Antwerp
 A12 motorway (France), a road connecting  Bailly and Bois-d'Arcy, Yvelines
 A 12 motorway (Germany), a road connecting Berlin and the Polish border
 A12 motorway (Italy), a road connecting Genoa and Rome
 A12 road (Latvia), a road connecting Jēkabpils and the Russian border
 A12 highway (Lithuania), a road connecting Ryga and Kaliningrad
 A12 road (Malaysia), a road in Perak connecting 
 A12 motorway (Netherlands), a road connecting The Hague with the German border
 A12 road (People's Republic of China) may refer to : 
 A12 expressway (Shanghai), a road connecting Wenshui Road - Jiading and Taicang
 A12 motorway (Poland), former (1986–2000) designation of partially existing motorway A18
 A-12 motorway (Spain), a road connecting Pamplona and Burgos
 A 12 road (Sri Lanka), a road connecting Puttalam and Trincomalee
 A12 motorway (Switzerland), a road connecting Bern and Vevey
 A12 road (United Kingdom) may refer to :
 A12 road (England), a road connecting London to Lowestoft, Suffolk
 A12 road (Isle of Man), a road connecting Derbyhaven and Castletown
 A12 road (Northern Ireland), a road connecting the M1 to the M2 and M3 motorways
 A12 road (United States of America) may refer to :
 A12 road (California), a road connecting Old 99 Highway and US 97 near Weed

See also
 list of highways numbered 12